The Cary Safe Company is a defunct safe company that was established and located in Buffalo, New York.

Products
The company manufactured and sold bank vaults, cabinets (safes), and safe deposit boxes from 1878 to 1929.
A majority of the safes sold by Cary had letters painted to the purchaser's request on the upper portion of the safe. Typically common was a customer's family name or the name of a business. Every Cary safe was built fire and burglar-proof. The company also manufactured intricate time locks and combination locks, (standard key) locks, and prison cells.

History
Although founded in 1878, the company wasn't incorporated until 1889. Members of the old firm continued with the new company.

These members include:

The company also employed a number of traveling salesmen around the United States.

Slogans
Popular company advertising slogans included:
 "Growing Great Since Seventy Eight"
 CARY SAFES "The Safe Investment"
 "Uniform Strength Throughout"

Locations

The company's headquarters, which included production and office buildings, was located in a 1 1/2-acre, three-story building, at the corner of 250-266 Chicago Street and 217–249 Scott Street. In the 1920s a service and sales building was opened at 1200 Niagara Street.

References

Manufacturing companies based in Buffalo, New York
Defunct companies based in New York (state)
Security technology